Santera Tequila is a brand of tequila made from blue agave. It is produced and bottled in Jalisco, Mexico.

The agave for Santera Tequila is grown in thevolcanic soil of the dormant Volcán de Tequila.  It is created by distiller Sebastian Melendrez.  The tequila is made with highland agave containing 21 degrees brix (sugar content) and the pinas are roasted for up to 54 hours in hornos (brick ovens).

After distillation, Santera Tequila undergoes a proprietary filtration process for each interpretation. The Blanco is unaged; the Reposado is aged for seven months; and the Añejo is aged for sixteen months in American oak barrels. All three tequilas are kosher-certified.

History 
Santera Spirits, LLC. was founded in 2012.

Varieties

Packaging 
Santera Tequila bottles have a rectangular shape made of white flint glass and a cork top stopper.

Awards

References

External links
 Official Site

Tequila
Alcoholic drink brands
Drink companies of Mexico
Mexican brands
Products introduced in 2015